ADS-AC is an experimental open source program which implements Absolutely Dynamic System (ADS), a proposed mechanism for Artificial Consciousness (AC).

Theory
ADS-AC uses a system of "points" or "nodes" connected by "links" to create a structure of "knots". The nodes have no properties other than their links to other nodes in order to maintain their absolute dynamicity.

See also
 Artificial Consciousness
 Artificial Intelligence
 Strong AI

History of artificial intelligence
1992 software